Peter Donald Shack (born 20 June 1953) is a former Australian politician who served as a member of the House of Representatives from 1977 to 1983 and from 1984 to 1993. He was a member of the Liberal Party and represented the Division of Tangney in Western Australia.

Early life
Shack was born in Perth, Western Australia. He is a descendant of Heinrich Schacht, who immigrated to Australia in 1860s from the German-Danish border region of Schleswig-Holstein; another of Heinrich Schacht's descendants was Labor Senator Chris Schacht. Shack was educated at Wesley College, Perth and the University of Western Australia before becoming a company director and political advisor.

Politics
In 1977, aged 24, Shack was elected to the House of Representatives as the Liberal member for Tangney. He was defeated by Labor's George Gear in 1983.  However, a redistribution for the 1984 election made Tangney notionally Liberal, forcing Gear to transfer to nearby Canning.  Shack ran for his old seat in that election and won it with a large swing.  He held the seat without serious difficulty until his retirement in 1993.

Criminal conviction
In January 2013, Shack was convicted of stealing $100,000 from his mother-in-law Mary Stasinowsky in July 2004. On 26 April he was sentenced to 14 months imprisonment.

References

Liberal Party of Australia members of the Parliament of Australia
Members of the Australian House of Representatives for Tangney
Members of the Australian House of Representatives
1953 births
Living people
People educated at Wesley College, Perth
20th-century Australian politicians
Australian people of German descent
Australian politicians convicted of crimes